The Charles F. Adams class is a ship class of 29 guided-missile destroyers (DDG) built between 1958 and 1967. Twenty-three were built for the United States Navy, three for the Royal Australian Navy, and three for the West German Bundesmarine. The design of these ships (known as project SCB 155) was based on that of s, but the Charles F. Adams class were the first class designed to serve as guided-missile destroyers.  of length was added to the center of the design of the Forrest Sherman class to carry the ASROC launcher. The Charles F. Adams-class were the last steam turbine-powered destroyers built for the U.S. Navy. Starting with the succeeding Spruance-class, all U.S. Navy destroyers have been powered by gas turbines. Some of the U.S. Charles F. Adams class served during the blockade of Cuba in 1962 and during the Vietnam War; those of the Royal Australian Navy served during the Vietnam War and Gulf War.

New threat update program and decommissioning
Although designed with cutting-edge technology for the 1950s, by the mid-1970s it was clear to the Navy that the Charles F. Adams-class destroyers were not prepared to deal with modern air attacks and guided missiles. To reduce this vulnerability, the U.S. Navy began the New Threat Upgrade (NTU) program. This consisted of a number of sensor, weapons and communications upgrades that were intended to extend the service lives of the ships. Under the NTU, these destroyers received improved electronic warfare capability through the installation of the AN/SLQ-32(V)2 EW Suite.

The upgraded combat system would include the MK86 Gun Fire Control System with AN/SPQ-9 radar, the Hughes AN/SPS-52C 3D radar, the AN/SPG-51C (Digital) Fire Control Radars, and the Naval Tactical Data System (NTDS). These ships were also planned to have the ability to launch several Harpoon anti-ship missiles, which were to be installed in their MK-11 or MK-13 Tartar missile launcher.

During the 1980s, the Reagan Administration chose to accelerate production of the  guided-missile cruisers and build the  guided-missile destroyers, both classes with the Aegis Combat System that was considered more effective than NTU-upgraded ships, to gradually replace all existing destroyer and cruiser classes (especially the expensive nuclear-powered cruisers). The result of this was that only three of Charles F. Adams-class destroyers, and  received the full upgrade. Other ships, of the class, such as Charles F. Adams, received only partial upgrades, which included the AN/SLQ-32 and Harpoon Missile upgrades, that were intended to extend their service lives until the Arleigh Burke class could reach operational capability.

The United States Navy decommissioned its last Charles F. Adams destroyer, Goldsborough, on 29 April 1993. The Australian and German navies decommissioned their last ships of this class by 2003. Four ships of this class were transferred to the Hellenic Navy in 1992, but those have also been decommissioned.

 was originally planned to open as a museum ship sometime in 2018, but those plans were put on hold and the ship was sent to be scrapped in 2020. The  was made into a museum ship, but all of the other destroyers in the class have been sunk as targets, sunk for diving wrecks or sold for scrap.

Ships in class

Hellenic Navy
Four destroyers were transferred to the Hellenic Navy;

 (formerly USS Semmes)
 (formerly USS Waddell)
 (formerly USS Joseph Strauss)
 (formerly USS Berkeley)

Lütjens class

The  was a modification of the Charles F. Adams class for the Bundesmarine (the Navy of West Germany). It differed from the Charles F. Adams class in the layout of the crew accommodations, the location of the bow sonar, a second large aerial mast and different funnels.
  (scrapped)
  (Museum ship)
  (scrapped)

Perth class

The Royal Australian Navy had three Charles F. Adams-class units constructed to their own specifications (these ships were designated the ). Although broadly similar to the US Navy's vessels, the Australian ships were fitted with the Ikara system instead of the ASROC that was fitted to the American units. The three ships were:
  (sunk as a dive wreck)
  (sunk as a dive wreck)
  (sunk as a dive wreck)

Notes

References

External links

 Mölders (D 186), Deutsches Marine Museum, Wilhelmshaven, Germany
 HMAS Perth (DDG-38), Artificial Dive Reef, Albany Australia
 USS Charles F. Adams (DDG-2), Jacksonville Historic Naval Ship Association, Jacksonville Florida
 Charles F. Adams-class Veterans Association
 Charles F. Adams-class guided missile destroyers at Destroyer History Foundation

 
Destroyer classes